Salme may refer to:

People

Given name 
 Salme Ekbaum (1912–1995), Estonian writer and poet
 Salme Pekkala-Dutt (1888–1964), Estonian-British communist politician
 Salme Poopuu (1939–2017), Estonian filmmaker and actress
 Salme Reek (1907–1996), Estonian actress
 Salme Rootare (1913–1987), Estonian chess master
 Salme Setälä (1894–1980), Finnish architect and writer

Surname 
 Jean-Baptiste Salme (1766–1811), French general of the Napoleonic Wars

Geography 
 Salme, Nepal
 Salme Parish, municipality in Saare County, Estonia
 Salme, Estonia, settlement in Salme Parish
 Salme, village in Abkhazia, Georgia

Other 
 Salme ships, two clinker-built ships of Viking Scandinavian origin discovered in Salme village on the island of Saaremaa, Estonia

Estonian feminine given names